The Crossing is an American science fiction thriller series that aired on ABC. The series debuted on April 2, 2018, and aired its final episode on June 9, 2018. On March 19, 2018, ABC released the pilot episode on their website. The series was filmed in British Columbia,  Canada. On May 11, 2018, ABC cancelled the show after one season.

Premise
Refugees fleeing a war seek asylum in an American town—but they claim to be from America, 180 years in the future. Moreover, at least one of the refugees exhibits apparently superhuman powers that may make her a threat.

Cast
 Steve Zahn as Sheriff Jude Ellis
 Natalie Martinez as Reece
 Sandrine Holt as Agent Emma Ren
 Tommy Bastow as Marshall
 Rob Campbell as Paul
 Rick Gomez as Nestor Rosario
 Marcuis W. Harris as Caleb
 Grant Harvey as Roy Aronson
 Jay Karnes as Craig Lindauer
 Simone Kessell as Rebecca
 Kelley Missal as Hannah
 Luc Roderique as Bryce Foster
 Bailey Skodje as Leah
 John D'Leo as Will
 Georgina Haig as Dr. Sophie Forbin

Production
Set in the fictional town of Port Canaan, Oregon and in Seattle, the series was filmed in coastal areas of British Columbia and in the city of Vancouver in 2017. The beach where the refugees arrive is near Ucluelet on Vancouver Island while the sheriff's office and some other locations were filmed in and around the village of Britannia Beach, north of Vancouver. The Oceanic Plaza in Vancouver was the setting for the Seattle offices of the show's Homeland Security and other scenes were filmed in and around the city. Additional shooting locations in BC were in Steveston, British Columbia and in New Westminster. The first camp footage was filmed at Camp McLean. Filming in Vancouver started in July and wrapped in late-November 2017.

On May 11, 2018, ABC canceled the show after one season.

Episodes

Reception

Critical response
On the review aggregator website Rotten Tomatoes, the series has an approval rating of 60% based on 20 reviews, with an average rating of 5.79/10. The website's critics consensus reads, "Though somewhat derivative and overstuffed, The Crossing offers up just enough decent twists to draw intrigue." Metacritic, which uses a weighted average, assigned a score of 59 out of 100 based on 12 critics, indicating "mixed or average reviews".

Ratings

See also
 The 4400 and 4400 - A ball of light deposits a group of 4400 people who vanished without a trace over the last century, having not aged a single day and with no memory of what happened to them.
 The Refugees - Three billion people from the future have traveled to the present to escape from an imminent global disaster.
 Beforeigners - A "time migration" occurs all over the world, with people from the Stone Age, Viking Age, and the 19th century. Set in Oslo.

Notes

References

External links

2010s American drama television series
2010s American science fiction television series
2018 American television series debuts
2018 American television series endings
American Broadcasting Company original programming
English-language television shows
Television series by ABC Studios
American time travel television series
American adventure television series
Television shows filmed in Vancouver
Television shows set in Oregon
2010s American time travel television series